Bailly-en-Rivière is a commune in the Seine-Maritime department in the Normandy region in northern France.

Geography

Heraldry

Population

Places of interest
 The church of St.Martin, dating from the twelfth century.
 Vestiges of a feudal castle.
 Château de Montigny.

Twin towns
 Herstal (Milmort village), in Belgium since 1973.

See also
Communes of the Seine-Maritime department

References

Communes of Seine-Maritime